The 23rd edition of Vuelta a España (Tour of Spain), a long-distance bicycle stage race and one of the three grand tours, was held from 25 April to 12 May 1968. Basque nationalist ETA terrorists detonated a bomb along the course on stage 15, causing that day's racing to be annulled. The race was won by Felice Gimondi of the Salvarani cycling team. With this win in the 1968 Vuelta a España, the 1967 Giro d'Italia and the 1965 Tour de France, Gimondi became the second cyclist after Jacques Anquetil to win all three grand tours in his career. Defending champion Jan Janssen won the points competition and 1966 champion Francisco Gabica won the mountains classification.

Teams and riders

Route

Results

Final General Classification

References

 
1968 in road cycling
1968
1968 in Spanish sport
1968 Super Prestige Pernod